The yeshiva of Kairouan is a former center for the study of Torah and Talmud located in Kairouan, Tunisia.

The yeshiva was founded by Ḥushi'el b. Elhanan. It reached its peak during the 10th century and is considered to be the first important yeshiva in North Africa. Very well known throughout the Jewish world, she was closely linked to the yeshivot of Babylonia, as several correspondence attests.

Note that the city of Kairouan experienced a large Jewish community which was formed during the founding of the city but which had to leave for other cities in Tunisia following its expulsion by the Almohads.

References 

Kairouan